Holeman is a surname. Notable people with the surname include:

William Holman (1871–1934), Australian statesman
John Holeman (born 1963), American surfer
John Dee Holeman (1929–2021), American Piedmont blues guitarist, singer, and songwriter
Linda Holeman, Canadian writer

It's also the name of comic book #214 of Jommeke.